Journal of Child and Family Studies is a quarterly peer-reviewed academic journal published by Springer Science+Business Media that focuses on family child, adolescent, and family psychology. The editors-in-chief are Cheri J. Shapiro  and Anne F. Farrell.

Abstracting and indexing 
The journal is abstracted and indexed in:

According to the Journal Citation Reports, the journal has a 2019 impact factor of 1.310.

References

External links 
 

Springer Science+Business Media academic journals
Publications established in 1992
Developmental psychology journals
Quarterly journals
English-language journals